Tan-y-Bwlch ( translates to Under the pass/gap) beach near Aberystwyth, Wales, forms part of the Pen Dinas and Tan-y-Bwlch Local Nature Reserve (LNR). The majority of which is located in the village of Penparcau. The area was designated in 1999 following a public meeting which attracted more than 100 local people. The  site contains the Bronze Age burial mound and Iron Age Hillfort named Pen Dinas. The site is managed by Ceredigion County Council  and is publicly owned, it is the largest Local nature reserve in the Dyfi Biosphere. The Wales Coastal Path runs along the top of the shingle beach. The beach is sometimes referred to as Penparcau Beach by locals in the area, the name is used on some mapping services.

External links

Aberystwyth
Nature reserves in Ceredigion